The Importation of Silk Act 1463 (3 Edw. 4, c. 3) was an Act of the Parliament of England passed during the reign of Edward IV.

The Act prohibited the importation of foreign made silk in order to protect the English silk industry located in London.

Notes

Acts of the Parliament of England
1463 in England
Protectionism
1460s in law